The BMP-23 (бойна машина на пехотата) is a Bulgarian infantry fighting vehicle which was first introduced in the early 1980s. However, it was based on a design from the Bulgarian design bureau from the 1970s, being presented in 1980s. The hull is based on that of the Soviet 2S1 self-propelled howitzer (also produced by Bulgaria) with thicker armour and a more powerful diesel engine, which is itself based on a stretched MT-LB chassis. Since the 2S1 is a larger vehicle, the troop transport compartment is not as cramped as that of the BMP-1. The armour is cast steel, capable of withstanding heavy machine gun fire. 

The BMP-23 was first seen on a parade in 1984.

Design

Armament 
The turret of the BMP-23 is armed with a 23-mm autocannon 2A14 from the air-defence gun ZU-23-2 with 600 rounds, and initially the 9M14 Malyutka ATGM was used however this was later replaced on the BMP-23D modernization with the 9K111 Fagot ATGM. There is also a coaxial PKT machine gun. As the BMP-30 variant uses a turret from the BMP-2 it has no ATGMs and uses the 2A42 autocannon.

Variants 
 BMP-23 - Baseline variant with 9M14 Malyutka ATGM.
 BMP-23D - Upgraded variant with 9K111 Fagot ATGM and 81mm smoke grenade launchers.
 BRM-23 - Reconnaissance version, limited production. Entered service in 1991.
 BMP-30 - Modified BMP-23 with the turret taken directly from the BMP-2.

Operators 
 : The BMP-23 has served with the Bulgarian army in Iraq.

References 

Tracked infantry fighting vehicles
Infantry fighting vehicles of Bulgaria
Bulgaria–Soviet Union relations
Military vehicles introduced in the 1980s